Sulfametrole (INN) is a sulfonamide antibacterial.

It can be given with trimethoprim.

References

Sulfonamide antibiotics
Thiadiazoles